Flavio Grassi (born 5 November 1968) is an Italian former sailor. He competed in the Flying Dutchman event at the 1992 Summer Olympics.

References

External links
 

1968 births
Living people
Italian male sailors (sport)
Olympic sailors of Italy
Sailors at the 1992 Summer Olympics – Flying Dutchman
People from Sanremo
Sportspeople from the Province of Imperia